Christopher Arnold may refer to:
 Chris Arnold (baseball) (born 1947), former Major League Baseball Player
 Christoph Arnold (1650–1695), German astronomer